Hiptage is a genus in the Malpighiaceae, a family of about 75 genera of flowering plants in the order Malpighiales. Hiptage comprises 30 (or more) species of vines and woody shrubs growing in forests of tropical southeastern Asia from Pakistan and India to Taiwan, the Philippines, and Indonesia. The genus is distinctive in its three-winged samaras; most species bear an elongated commissural gland on the calyx.

The most widely known species is Hiptage benghalensis, thought to be native from India and Sri Lanka to the Philippines; it is widely cultivated for its showy fragrant flowers, and its true native range is difficult to assess. This species often escapes from cultivation; it spreads aggressively and can become a pernicious weed.

References

External links
Hiptage
Malpighiaceae Malpighiaceae - description, taxonomy, phylogeny, and nomenclature

Malpighiaceae
Malpighiaceae genera